Goose Lake, in the U.S. state of Washington, is located within the Gifford Pinchot National Forest. Travel to Goose Lake is by dirt road, along Forest Road 60, also called the Carson Guler Road, typically free of snow by late June. Fed by several streams, Goose Lake was dammed by a lava flow from Big Lava Bed, directly to the south. The lake is 58 acres in size and includes a boat launch and campground with 18 primitive campsites. Popular for fishing in summer and early fall, Goose Lake contains brook, brown, and coastal cutthroat trout.

History 
Goose Lake formed when the Big Lava Bed dammed up a nearby stream. The blocked stream formed the lake. On the southeast side of the lake, there is a ghostly stand of dead trees rising from the water.

Recreation 
The lake is a popular spot for brook, brown and coastal cutthroat trout fishing. Goose Lake Campground offers a concrete boat ramp for launching small boats, kayaks and canoes. The campground also offers activities such as camping, hiking, and berry picking. Nearby places include the Big Lava Bed, south of the campground; a trail takes hikers through a landscape dotted by pine forest and basalt lava formations. The Indian Heaven Wilderness is located nearby and is known for its abundant huckleberries, meadowlands and pine forests, lakes, and as well as a variety of wildlife. Huckleberry picking is a popular pastime too.

Accessibility 
The lake is reached via 8 miles of narrow gravel road from the east from Trout Lake on State Route 141 north from SR 14, to the town of Trout Lake. Continue through the town on State Route 141 to where it ends and Forest Route 24 begins. Drive on Forest Route 24 to the junction with Forest Route 60 (Carson Guler Road) and follow Forest Route 60 (Carson Guler Road) for 1 mile to Goose Lake.

From the West, Carson, take the Wind River Righway, north to the Old State Highway. Heading towards Panther Creek Campground, continue past the campground on Forest Route 65 to the 4 corners, junction of Forest Route 65 and 60 (Carson Guler Road). From here, turn right on Forest Route 60 (Carson Guler Road), and continue on to Goose Lake.

See also 
 Lakes of Washington
Skamania County, Washington
Gifford Pinchot National Forest

References

External links 
Recreation.gov
Fs.usda.gov

Lakes of Washington (state)
Gifford Pinchot National Forest
Lakes of Skamania County, Washington
Tourist attractions in Skamania County, Washington